Norea is a commune (khum) of Sangkae District in Battambang Province in north-western Cambodia.

Villages

 Norea Muoy
 Norea Pir
 Balat
 Ta Kok

References

Communes of Battambang province
Sangkae District